The 1952 Lafayette Leopards football team was an American football team that represented Lafayette College in the Middle Three Conference during the 1952 college football season. In its first season under head coach Steve Hokuf, the team compiled a 0–9 record. Edward Greaves and Jack Herbruck were the team captains. The team played its home games at Fisher Field in Easton, Pennsylvania.

Schedule

References

Lafayette
Lafayette Leopards football seasons
Lafayette Leopards football
College football winless seasons